A somatic symptom disorder, formerly known as a somatoform disorder, is any mental disorder that manifests as physical symptoms that suggest illness or injury, but cannot be explained fully by a general medical condition or by the direct effect of a substance, and are not attributable to another mental disorder (e.g., panic disorder). Somatic symptom disorders, as a group, are included in a number of diagnostic schemes of mental illness, including the Diagnostic and Statistical Manual of Mental Disorders. (Before DSM-5 this disorder was split into somatization disorder and undifferentiated somatoform disorder.)

In people who have been diagnosed with a somatic symptom disorder, medical test results are either normal or do not explain the person's symptoms (medically unexplained physical symptoms), and history and physical examination do not indicate the presence of a known medical condition that could cause them, though the DSM-5 cautions that this alone is not sufficient for diagnosis. The patient must also be excessively worried about their symptoms, and this worry must be judged to be out of proportion to the severity of the physical complaints themselves. A diagnosis of somatic symptom disorder requires that the subject have recurring somatic complaints for at least six months.

Symptoms are sometimes similar to those of other illnesses and may last for years. Usually, the symptoms begin appearing during adolescence, and patients are diagnosed before the age of 30 years. Symptoms may occur across cultures and gender. Other common symptoms include anxiety and depression. However, since anxiety and depression are also very common in persons with confirmed medical illnesses, it remains unproven whether such symptoms are a consequence of the physical impairment or a cause. Somatic symptom disorders are not the result of conscious malingering (fabricating or exaggerating symptoms for secondary motives) or factitious disorders (deliberately producing, feigning, or exaggerating symptoms). Somatic symptom disorder is difficult to diagnose and treat. Some advocates of the diagnosis believe this is because proper diagnosis and treatment requires psychiatrists to work with neurologists on patients with this disorder.

History 
Somatisation disorder was first described by Paul Briquet in 1859 and was subsequently known as Briquet's syndrome. He described patients who had been sickly most of their lives and complained of multiple symptoms from different organ systems. Symptoms persist despite multiple consultations,  hospitalisations and investigations.

Definition
Somatic symptom disorders are a group of disorders, all of which fit the definition of physical symptoms similar to those observed in physical disease or injury for which there is no identifiable physical cause. As such, they are a diagnosis of exclusion. Somatic symptoms may be generalized in four major medical categories: neurological, cardiac, pain, and gastrointestinal somatic symptoms.

Diagnostic and Statistical Manual of Mental Disorders 
Somatic symptom disorders used to be recognized as Somatoform disorders in the Diagnostic and Statistical Manual of Mental Disorders of the American Psychiatric Association. The following were conditions under the term Somatoform Disorders:
 Conversion disorder: A somatic symptom disorder involving the actual loss of bodily function such as blindness, paralysis, and numbness due to excessive anxiety
 Somatization disorder
 Hypochondriasis
 Body dysmorphic disorder: wherein the individual is concerned with body image, and the disorder is manifested as excessive concern about and preoccupation with a perceived defect of their physical appearance.
 Pain disorder
 Undifferentiated somatic symptom disorder – only one unexplained symptom is required for at least six months.

In the newest version of DSM-5 (2013) somatic symptom disorders are recognized under the term somatic symptom and related disorders:
 Somatic symptom disorder: To replace many of what was formerly known as somatization disorders and hypochondriasis (hypochondria).
 Factitious disorder: Can be either imposed on oneself, or to someone else (formally known as factitious disorder by proxy).
 Illness anxiety disorder: A somatic symptom disorder involving persistent and excessive worry about developing a serious illness. This disorder has recently gone under review and has been altered into three different classifications.
 Somatoform disorder not otherwise specified (NOS)
Included among these disorders are false pregnancy, psychogenic urinary retention, and mass psychogenic illness (so-called mass hysteria).

Somatization disorder as a mental disorder was recognized in the DSM-IV-TR classification system, but in the latest version DSM-5, it was combined with undifferentiated somatoform disorder to become somatic symptom disorder, a diagnosis which no longer requires a specific number of somatic symptoms.

International Statistical Classification of Diseases and Related Health Problems 
The ICD-10, the latest version of the International Statistical Classification of Diseases and Related Health Problems, classifies conversion disorder as a dissociative disorder. ICD-10 still includes somatization syndrome.

Treatment 
Psychotherapy, more specifically, cognitive behavioral therapy (CBT), is the most widely used form of treatment for somatic symptom disorder. In 2016, a randomized 12-week study suggested steady and significant improvement in health anxiety measures with cognitive behavioral therapy compared to the control group.

CBT can help in some of the following ways:
 Learn to reduce stress
 Learn to cope with physical symptoms
 Learn to deal with depression and other psychological issues
 Improve quality of life
 Reduce preoccupation with symptom

Moreover, brief psychodynamic interpersonal psychotherapy (PIT) for patients with multisomatoform disorder has shown its long-term efficacy for improving the physical quality of life in patients with multiple, difficult-to-treat, medically unexplained symptoms.

Antidepressant medication has also been used to treat some of the symptoms of depression, anxiety, and pain that are common among people who have somatic symptom disorder. Medications will not cure somatic symptom disorder, but can help the treatment process when combined with CBT.

Controversy
Somatic symptom disorder has been a controversial diagnosis, since it was historically based primarily on negative criteria; that is, the absence of a medical explanation for the presenting physical complaints. Consequently, any person with a poorly understood illness can potentially fulfill the criteria for this psychiatric diagnosis, even if they exhibit no psychiatric symptoms in the conventional sense.

Misdiagnosis
In the opinion of Allen Frances, chair of the DSM-IV task force, the DSM-5's somatic symptom disorder brings with it a risk of mislabeling a sizable proportion of the population as mentally ill.

See also

References

Further reading
 

 
Somatic psychology